Pterophorus nigropunctatus is a moth of the family Pterophoridae. It is found in the Khasia Hills of Meghalaya, India.

References

 , 1989: Beitrag zur kenntnis der indo-australischen Pterophorus arten (Lepidoptera: Pterophoridae). Entomologische Zeitschrift 99 (7): 81-96.

Moths described in 1989
nigropunctatus
Moths of Asia